
Kelsey may refer to:

Places

Canada
 Kelsey, Alberta
 Kelsey, Manitoba
 Rural Municipality of Kelsey, Manitoba (unconnected with Kelsey, Manitoba)
 Kelsey Airport, Manitoba
 SIAST Kelsey Campus, one of four campuses of the Saskatchewan Institute of Applied Science and Technology in Saskatoon

United States
 Kelsey, California in El Dorado County
 Kelseyville, California in Lake County; formerly called Kelsey, California
 Kelsey, Ohio
 Kelsey, Texas
 Kelsey Museum of Archaeology at the University of Michigan
 Mount Kelsey, a mountain in New Hampshire

Other uses
 Kelsey (automobile company)
 Kelsey (given name)
 Kelsey (surname)
 Kelsey (actor), known for Shoe Diaries (1992), Return to Frogtown (1992) and Carjack (1993)
 "Kelsey" (song), a 2007 single by Metro Station from their debut album, Metro Station
 Kelsey Lake Diamond Mine, a defunct diamond mine in the U.S. state of Colorado
 Kelsey, a fashion doll in the 2001 series of Groovy Girls dolls, manufactured by Manhattan Toy

Different spellings
Kelsay, Indian scout serving in the United States Army during the Indian Wars who received the Medal of Honor
Kelsay (surname)
Kelsea
Kelsea Ballerini
Kelsy
Kelcy
Kelcey